Homeric is an adjective meaning of, relating to, or characteristic of Homer.

Homeric can also refer to:

Homeric Greek, a form of Ancient Greek employed by Homer
RMS Homeric (1922), White Star Line ship originally known as Columbus (1913)
SS Homeric, a Home Lines ship renamed in 1953 from the original SS Mariposa (1931)
MS Homeric, built 1986 (renamed  MS Westerdam in 1988).
Homeric simile, a long and descriptive simile common in Homer.
Homeric Hymns, a set of hymns once attributed to Homer but now named “Homeric” because of similarities in meter, formulas, and dialect.

See also
Homerian